NK Vrbovec is a Croatian football club based in the town of Vrbovec in Zagreb County.
It was founded in 1924 and is now playing in the third tier of Croatian football, Treća HNL – Center.

Their stadium is called Sajmište ("Marketplace") and has a capacity of 3.000 spectators.

Club names through history
 VŠK Zrinski (1924–1945),
 Naprijed    (1946–1948),
 Vrbovec     (1949–1970),
 Zrinski     (1971–1972),
 PIK Vrbovec (1972–2001) (after joining with SD PIK Vrbovec)
 NK Vrbovec (2001–)

Honours

 Treća HNL – Center:
Winners (1): 1998–99

Ranking by season

External links

Football clubs in Croatia
Association football clubs established in 1924
1924 establishments in Croatia